Marco Albori, better known by his alias Albert Marco, was an Italian bootlegger who was active in Los Angeles during the Prohibition Era in the 1920s. He is said to be the first to transport Canadian whiskey to Los Angeles. Marco worked closely with Charles H. Crawford, who ran city politics along with Kent Kane Parrot.

Biography
Marco was born in 1887 in Italy. Marco came to the United States through Ellis Island in 1908. He started off as a pimp and con man in Nevada and Washington. In 1919 he served a brief prison sentence for burglary in Sacramento. Crawford, an old friend from their days in Seattle convinced Marco to move to Los Angeles. In the early 1920s Marco drove to L.A. in a Cadillac transporting alcohol to a Long Beach warehouse. The political connections created by Crawford's political machine let Marco operate without much fear of prosecution for his crimes. In 1925 Marco pistol whipped an LAPD officer and was given a $50 fine and his gun back. According to the IRS, between 1922 and 1924 Marco earned $500,000 from bordello prostitution.

On June 28, 1928, Marco was arrested and put on trial for assault with a deadly weapon when he shot Dominick Conterno and Harry Judson. He was found guilty on two counts and was sentenced to two seven-year terms by judge William C. Doran. On April 1, 1929, Marco was sent to San Quentin State Prison to serve his sentence. Marco appealed the ruling, but was denied a second trial. He was paroled on April 7, 1933. Marco was deported to Italy in November 1933. He returned to Los Angeles in 1937 hoping to permanently stay in the United States, but he was denied and ordered to return to Italy again.

References

Rayner, Richard A Bright and Guilty Place: Murder, Corruption, and L.A.'s Scandalous Coming of Age, Random House of Canada, 2009. 

1887 births
Italian emigrants to the United States
Year of death missing